The Five Points Historic District is a historic district in Huntsville, Alabama in the vicinity and east of the intersection of Holmes Avenue, Pratt Avenue, California Street, and Andrew Jackson Way. It features homes built around the turn of the 20th Century in several styles, including California Bungalow, Queen Anne and other modest Victorian styles dating from the late 1890s through the early 1900s. The district was listed on the National Register of Historic Places in August 2012.

Notable structures 
 Vaught House — 701 Ward Ave., added to National Register of Historic Places in 1981.

References

External links 
Five Points Historic District Association has photos, history and events.
American Memory's Built in America Collection which has drawings, photographs, and descriptions of old homes and buildings.
Huntsville Pilgrimage Association conducts annual tour of historic homes.

Historic districts in Huntsville, Alabama
National Register of Historic Places in Huntsville, Alabama
Historic districts on the National Register of Historic Places in Alabama